The 1991–92 1. FC Nürnberg season was the 88th season in the club's history and the 7th consecutive season playing in the Bundesliga since promotion from 2. Bundesliga in 1985. Nürnberg finished seventh in the league.

The club also participated in the DFB-Pokal where it reached the semi-finals, losing in penalties to TSV Havelse.

Competitions

Overview

Bundesliga

DFB Pokal

Statistics

Squad statistics

|}

References

1. FC Nürnberg seasons
Nürnberg